Jaroslav Skála (born 27 May 1954) is a Czech former basketball player.

Professional career
During his club career, Skála was a two-time Czechoslovakian League champion, in the years 1981 and 1982. He was also named the Czechoslovakian Player of the Year, in 1981.

National team career
With the senior Czechoslovakian national team, Skála competed in the men's tournament at the 1980 Summer Olympics. With Czechoslovakia, he also won the bronze medal at the 1981 EuroBasket, and the silver medal at the 1985 EuroBasket.

See also
Czechoslovak Basketball League career stats leaders

References

External links
 

1954 births
Living people
Basketball players at the 1980 Summer Olympics
Centers (basketball)
Czech men's basketball players
Czechoslovak men's basketball players
1974 FIBA World Championship players
1982 FIBA World Championship players
Olympic basketball players of Czechoslovakia
Sportspeople from Plzeň